Invisible Hitchcock is a studio album by Robyn Hitchcock. A collection of leftovers and out-takes recorded from 1981–1985, Hitchcock's sleeve notes explain that the album was assembled because the songs "didn't fit in with what I was doing at the time and do fit in with each other now".

The US version of the LP (on Relativity) replaced "It's a Mystic Trip" with "Grooving on a Inner Plane". The CD versions of the album omit "Grooving on a Inner Plane" but include additional tracks.

Track listing
All songs written by Robyn Hitchcock

Side one 
"All I Wanna Do Is Fall in Love" – 3:46
"Give Me a Spanner, Ralph" – 2:36
"A Skull, a Suitcase, and a Long Red Bottle of Wine" – 4:58
"My Favourite Buildings" – 3:12
"It's a Mystic Trip" – 2:57 [UK LP] / "Grooving on a Inner Plane" (alternate version) – 4:10 [US LP]
"The Pit of Souls" (country version) – 5:56

Side two 
"Trash" – 2:51
"Mr. Deadly" – 4:13
"Star of Hairs" – 3:15
"I Got a Message For You" – 3:05
"Vegetable Friend" – 2:12
"Point It at Gran" – 2:02
"Let There Be More Darkness" – 2:57
"Blues in A" – 3:26

Glass Fish CD (1986) bonus tracks 
"Falling Leaves" – 4:25
"Eaten by Her Own Dinner" – 4:28
"Messages of Dark" – 3:51
"The Abandoned Brain" – 2:53

Rhino CD (1995) bonus tracks 
"Falling Leaves" – 4:25
"Eaten by Her Own Dinner" – 4:28
"Messages of Dark" – 3:51
"The Abandoned Brain" – 2:53
"Listening to the Higsons" – 2:46
"Dr. Sticky" – 3:33

References

Robyn Hitchcock albums
1986 compilation albums